Venus Williams was the two-time defending champion and successfully defended her title, by defeating Lindsay Davenport 7–6(8–6), 6–4 in the final.

Seeds
The first four seeds received a bye into the second round.

Draw

Finals

Top half

Bottom half

References

External links
 Official results archive (ITF)
 Official results archive (WTA)

Pilot Pen Tennis
Connecticut Open (tennis)
2001 Pilot Pen Tennis